Stročín is a village and municipality in Svidník District in the Prešov Region of north-eastern Slovakia.

History

In historical records the village was first mentioned in 1317.

Geography

The municipality lies at an altitude of 213 metres and covers an area of 8.657 km2. It has a population of about 500 people.

External links
 
 
http://www.statistics.sk/mosmis/eng/run.html

Villages and municipalities in Svidník District
Šariš